Oswald Haselrieder OMRI (born 22 August 1971 in Völs am Schlern, South Tyrol) is an Italian luger of Austrian descent who competed internationally from 1988 to 2010. He achieved success at junior level, taking two bronze medals in singles and a gold in doubles at the World Junior Championships, the latter achieved in partnership with Dietmar Pierhofer. Haselrider and Pierhofer continued to compete together until 1995, when they split up and Haselrieder joined forces with Gerhard Plankensteiner. Haselrieder went on to win the bronze medal in the men's doubles event at the 2006 Winter Olympics in Turin after competing in three previous Winter Olympic Games: in 1992 in the singles event and in doubles in 1998 and 2002. He went on to compete in a fifth Olympics in 2010: he retired soon afterwards after sustaining an injury in training in March of that year.

Haselrieder also won four medals at the FIL World Luge Championships with one gold (Men's doubles: 2009) and three bronzes (Men's doubles: 1996, Mixed team: 1996, 1997). At the FIL European Luge Championships, he won seven medals with one silver (Men's doubles: 1996) and six bronzes (Men's doubles: 2002, 2008 (tied with Germany); Mixed team: 1992, 1996, 2000, 2008). He also won four Italian national titles in doubles.

Haselrieder's best overall Luge World Cup finish was second in men's doubles in 1996-7. He took a total of five World Cup race wins in doubles competition.

He was made a knight of the Order of Merit of the Italian Republic in 2006. After his retirement, he became a member of technical staff for the Italian national luge team.

His wife, Doris, competed as a natural track luger for Italy in the early to mid-1990s.

References

 1992 luge men's singles results
 1998 luge men's doubles results
 2002 luge men's doubles results
 Armin Zöggeler is married. at the Fédération Internationale de Luge de Course (14 June 2007 article accessed 9 February 2010.)
 
 
 
 
 List of European luge champions

External links
 

1971 births
Living people
Italian male lugers
Lugers at the 1992 Winter Olympics
Lugers at the 1998 Winter Olympics
Lugers at the 2002 Winter Olympics
Lugers at the 2006 Winter Olympics
Lugers at the 2010 Winter Olympics
Olympic bronze medalists for Italy
Olympic lugers of Italy
Olympic medalists in luge
Medalists at the 2006 Winter Olympics
Knights of the Order of Merit of the Italian Republic
Italian sports coaches
People from Völs am Schlern
Germanophone Italian people
Sportspeople from Südtirol